Stirling Terrace is the main street of Toodyay, Western Australia, originally called New Road until 1905.

Route description
At the street's north-western end, through-traffic can continue north via Telegraph Road and Bindi Bindi–Toodyay Road to Bindi Bindi, or west via Harper Road and Julimar Road to Chittering.

Buildings
A considerable number of heritage properties are found on the terrace.
The historic frontage of residences, shops and other buildings along Stirling Terrace is collectively termed the Stirling Terrace Streetscape Group.
The State Register of Heritage Buildings includes Connor's Mill, Toodyay Public Library (built 1874), the old Toodyay Post Office (designed by George Temple-Poole and built 1897) and the old Toodyay Fire Station (designed by Ken Duncan, built 1938).  Buildings listed on the Australian Heritage Database include Freemasons Hotel (built 1861), the Victoria Hotel (late 1890s), Robert Urwin's Drapery, and St Stephens Anglican Church.

A number of other buildings are along the road:
 Butterly House
 Catholic Presbytery, Toodyay
 Connor's Cottage
 Connor's House
 Demasson's House and Shop
 Dr Growse's House
 Ellery's Arcade
 Freemasons Hotel (Toodyay)
 Hackett's (Pensioner) Cottage
 Jager Stores
 James Martin's Cottage
 Kirk's (Pensioner) Cottage
 Leeder's House
 Roman Catholic Church Group, Toodyay
 Shoemaker's House
 St Aloysius Convent boys dormitory, Toodyay
 St Aloysius Convent girls dormitory, Toodyay
 St Aloysius Convent of Mercy
 St John the Baptist Church (Toodyay)
 St John the Baptist Church, Toodyay (1863–1963)
 Stationmaster's House (Toodyay)
 Stirling House
 Toodyay Garage
 Toodyay Memorial Hall
 Toodyay Tavern
 Urwin's Store
 Victoria Billiard Saloon
 Wendouree Tearooms
 Western Australian Bank, Newcastle Branch

History

The name Stirling Terrace was adopted at a Newcastle Municipal Council meeting in May 1905. Following discussion of a motion to rename the town's main road, two names were voted on: Bedford Terrace, after Governor Bedford, and Stirling Terrace, after the former Governor Stirling. The votes were split 3–3, so Mayor Henry Davey cast the deciding vote for Stirling Terrace. The change in name was officially made on 3 May 1911.

In 2009 the upgrading from federal and state funding was completed.

The northern end of the street, in the vicinity of the Avon Bridge, is a popular walking spot for tourists.

See also

 Major roads in the Wheatbelt region of Western Australia

Notes